Mangrovimonas spongiae is a Gram-negative, rod-shaped and motile bacterium from the genus of Mangrovimonas which has been isolated from a marine sponge from the Yangpu Bay in China.

References

Flavobacteria
Bacteria described in 2020